Karma Tshomo (born 10 October 1973), is an archer who internationally represented Bhutan

Tshomo competed for Bhutan at the 1992 Summer Olympics in Barcelona, she finished 58th in the individual event, the highest out of the Bhutanese women's and the team finished 17th.

References

External links
 

1973 births
Living people
Olympic archers of Bhutan
Archers at the 1992 Summer Olympics
Bhutanese female archers
Place of birth missing (living people)